Dalton Larkin McMichael, Sr. (March 10, 1914 – July 27, 2001) was an American textile executive and philanthropist. He was ranked among the top fifty most influential textile executives in the twentieth century by Textile World Magazine. He was inducted into the Class of 2003 American Textile Hall of Fame by the American Textile History Museum.

Early life 
Dalton Larkin McMichael was born in Wentworth, North Carolina. He was named after his maternal grandparents, Susan Victoria Dalton and Lieutenant Larkin DeShazo, a confederate officer who served in May's Company of the 45th Infantry Regiment. He attended the University of North Carolina at Chapel Hill for pre-medicine, later switching to accounting, graduating in 1938.

Career 
McMichael's first textile job was for the Cost Accounting Department at Burlington Industries in Greensboro, North Carolina. He later moved to sales in the hosiery division of the company. He then moved to New York for three years where he met William Johnston Armfield III, the general manager of the hosiery division at Burlington Industries. Together in 1946 they formed the Madison Throwing Company in Madison. In 1954, they sold an interest in the company to Burlington Industries. Madison Throwing grew to over three-thousand employees before becoming a wholly owned subsidiary of Burlington Industries in 1970.
Armfield's son, Billy Armfield, joined Madison Throwing Company in 1959, eventually becoming president. Dalton went into business with Billy Armfield, creating Macfield Texturing Company in 1970, which was sold to Unifi in 1991.

In 1982, McMichael, along with other textile industry leaders, formed Vintage Yarns, which was sold to Unifi in 1993. In 1992, McMichael created Mayo Yarns and Dan Valley Yarns. These two companies later merged, and then merged with Frontier Spinning in 2000, when McMichael retired.

In 1998, McMichael received Textile World's Lifetime Achievement Award for his work in the textured yarn business.

McMichael served on the Madison and Mayodan School Boards of Education for sixteen years. Dalton L. McMichael High School in Mayodan, North Carolina was named in his honor.

Philanthropy 
McMichael was a benefactor of the University of North Carolina at Chapel Hill, the UNC School of Dentistry, Elon University, Salem College, Davidson College, Morehead Memorial Hospital] and it's John Smith, Jr./Dalton McMichael Cancer Center.

Personal life 
McMichael married Dorothy Louise Ragsdale and had four children; Gail McMichael Drew, Flavel McMichael Godfrey, Dalton Larkin McMichael, Jr., and Louise McMichael Miracle. When his first wife died, McMichael was remarried to Hanne Andersen. McMichael died on July 27, 2001, at Wake Forest University Baptist Medical Center in Winston-Salem at the age of eighty-seven. His funeral was held on July 30, 2001, at Madison Presbyterian Church, where he was a parishioner. He is buried in Woodland Cemetery in Madison, North Carolina.

References 

1914 births
2001 deaths
20th-century American businesspeople
American business executives
American company founders
American Presbyterians
American textile industry businesspeople
Businesspeople from North Carolina
Corporate executives
People from Wentworth, North Carolina
School board members in North Carolina
University of North Carolina at Chapel Hill alumni
People from Madison, North Carolina
20th-century American philanthropists